The Joker is a character and the main antagonist in Christopher Nolan's 2008 superhero film The Dark Knight. Based on the DC Comics supervillain of the same name, he is portrayed by Heath Ledger and is depicted as a psychopathic criminal mastermind with a warped, sadistic sense of humor who defines himself by his conflict with the vigilante Batman. In the film, the Joker tests how far Batman will go to save Gotham City from descending into chaos. He targets Batman's allies, including police lieutenant James Gordon and district attorney Harvey Dent, to prove that no one is incorruptible.

Ledger's interpretation of the Joker as an avatar of anarchy and chaos was specifically influenced by the graphic novels Batman: The Killing Joke and Arkham Asylum: A Serious House on Serious Earth. He wears the character's traditional purple and green color palette, while his disfigured appearance is the result of a Glasgow smile covered by clown makeup rather than falling into a vat of chemical waste like the source material. For his performance, Ledger explored techniques from his previous roles, including his clown act in Terry Gilliam's fantasy film The Brothers Grimm, and took inspiration from paintings by artist Francis Bacon, Anthony Burgess' novel A Clockwork Orange and various punk rock musicians.

Ledger's casting as the Joker was initially controversial but it is now widely considered his finest performance; Ledger himself regarded it as his most enjoyable. When the film was released in July 2008, six months after Ledger died of an accidental overdose, the performance received widespread acclaim and numerous posthumous accolades, including the Academy Award for Best Supporting Actor. The character is widely considered to be one of the greatest villains in film history, as well as one of the most iconic interpretations of the Joker.

Character biography 
The character is indirectly referenced at the end of Batman Begins, when lieutenant James Gordon (Gary Oldman) tells Batman (Christian Bale) about a criminal who leaves behind joker playing cards at crime scenes.

The introductory sequence of The Dark Knight sees a gang of masked criminals rob a mafia-owned bank, each betraying and killing each other until the Joker, the sole survivor and mastermind, escapes with the money.

The Joker interrupts a meeting between mafia bosses Sal Maroni (Eric Roberts), Gambol (Michael Jai White) and the Chechen (Ritchie Coster) and offers to kill Batman for half of their fortune. Gambol refuses so the Joker kills him and takes over his gang. When Batman captures the mob's accountant Lau (Ng Chin Han), Maroni and the Chechen accept the Joker's offer, and he kills high-profile targets involved in the trial, including judge Janet Surillo (Nydia Rodriguez Terracina) and police commissioner Gillian B. Loeb (Colin McFarlane). The Joker threatens that his attacks will continue until Batman reveals his identity. He targets district attorney Harvey Dent (Aaron Eckhart) at a fundraising dinner and throws his girlfriend Rachel Dawes (Maggie Gyllenhaal) out of a window, but Batman rescues her.

When Dent attempts to draw him out by identifying himself as Batman, the Joker tries to kidnap him, only to be arrested and interrogated by Batman after Dent goes missing. The Joker reveals that Dent's girlfriend (and Bruce Wayne's childhood sweetheart) Rachel Dawes (Maggie Gyllenhaal) has also gone missing and divulges their separate locations, both rigged with time bombs, but lies about which location each hostage is held at. Batman saves Dent, who is disfigured in the explosion, while Rachel is killed. The Joker then escapes the police station with Lau.

The Joker kills Lau and the Chechen, burns his half of the mob's money and takes over the Chechen's gang. To prevent Wayne Enterprises M&A law accountant Coleman Reese (Joshua Harto) from revealing Batman's secret identity on TV, the Joker announces that he will blow up a hospital if Reese is not dead within 60 minutes. During the ensuing panic, the Joker sneaks into Gotham General Hospital disguised as a nurse to meet with Dent and persuades him to take revenge on the people he holds responsible for Rachel's death. The Joker gives Dent a handgun and forcibly holds it to his own head, allowing his fate to be decided by a coin flip. Spared by chance, he then blows up the hospital and takes a busload of hostages. Joker's actions here resemble that of the notorious trolley problem, where an individual or group is troubled with making the choice to kill one to save many in a disturbing twist of morals. 

The Joker rigs explosives on two ferries leaving the Gotham bay, one containing citizens and the other transporting criminals, and tells the passengers that he will destroy both boats unless one blows up the other by midnight. While Batman fights the Joker, the ferry passengers choose not to blow each other up. Batman subsequently apprehends the Joker, who states that he believes that they are meant to fight each other forever: Batman's moral code will not allow him to kill the Joker, while the Joker will not kill Batman because matching wits with him is "just too much fun". The Joker then gloats that he has won "the battle for Gotham's soul", as the city's inhabitants will lose hope once Dent's killing spree as "Two-Face" becomes known. The Joker then laughs hysterically as he is arrested by a SWAT team. Batman then foils the Joker's plan by taking the blame for Dent's crimes so that Dent will be remembered as a hero.

The Joker is not mentioned in The Dark Knight Rises, the 2012 sequel to The Dark Knight, because director Christopher Nolan felt it was "inappropriate" to account for "a real-life tragedy", referencing Ledger's death. However, the novelization of the film by Greg Cox makes an ambiguous reference to the character while describing Blackgate Prison:

Background 

As a starting actor, Heath Ledger did not attach himself seriously to the roles he was playing. This changed, however, when at age 22 he started to watch some of his films. Realizing that they were movies he himself might not actually have wanted to see, it made him more cautious and respectful towards his professional choices. The 2005 fantasy film The Brothers Grimm marked a turning point for the actor as director Terry Gilliam gave Ledger (and his co-star, Matt Damon) opportunities to create characters they had not been given before. Gilliam helped Ledger put on a clown act for that film, an experience the actor later acknowledged as an influence for his performance as the Joker.

Director Christopher Nolan had met with Ledger over the years for different roles. While meeting for the part of Batman in Batman Begins, Ledger explained that he was not interested in working on such a film. The actor reflected on his problems with portraying superheroes, saying; "I would just feel stupid and silly. I couldn't pull it off and there are other people who can perfectly, but I just couldn't take myself seriously"; Ledger normally disliked comic book movies. However, later impressed with Batman Begins, Ledger sought the part of the Joker from Nolan. Impressed with Ledger's determination, Nolan cast him in the part. "Heath was just ready to do it, he was ready to do something that big." Casting director John Papsidera reflected on the casting choice, saying the filmmakers knew they needed somebody courageous to play the part. Heath Ledger was cast before there was a script.

Performance 
Heath Ledger described the Joker as a "psychopathic, mass murdering, schizophrenic clown with zero empathy". Highlighting the opportunity for freshness, Ledger aimed for a new and different interpretation of the character, separate from previous film incarnations.

Ledger and Christopher Nolan both explained seeing eye-to-eye on the Joker's appearance in the film, sharing common reference points for who the character was going to be. Based on philosophical ideas of anarchy and chaos, they looked at art by Francis Bacon for visual reference and they talked about Malcolm McDowell's performance as Alex in Stanley Kubrick's film A Clockwork Orange, and who Alex is in Anthony Burgess' novel of the same name. Ledger was given Alan Moore's graphic novel Batman: The Killing Joke for preparation for the role, as well as Grant Morrison's graphic novel Arkham Asylum: A Serious House on Serious Earth, which he "really tried to read and put it down". The vocal style Ledger used is rumored to be influenced by Tom Waits. In an interview with MTV, Ledger said he regarded the experience playing the Joker as the most fun he ever had, "and probably will ever have".

Description 

Wearing the character's traditional color palette, the Joker is dressed in a light purple shirt, a thin medium-toned purple tie and a green waistcoat, topped by a dark purple overcoat, clothing which the film reveals has been custom made. The patterns and designs chosen were very popular during the Victorian and Edwardian periods; however, they are given an eccentric twist using the purple and green color palette. His shoes have an upward swoop at the toe, reminiscent of clown shoes. He carries no identification of any kind and offers no clear details about his true name or background; when he is arrested by the Gotham City police, they find only knives and lint in his pockets.

The Joker's hair is stringy, unkempt, and dyed green. His face is covered in a cracked and runny layer of white clown makeup, with his sunken eyes thickly rimmed in black. A sloppy red grin is painted across his mouth and cheeks, partly obscuring the scars of a Glasgow smile. Film critic Peter Travers wrote about the Joker as having "the grungy hair and the yellowing teeth of a hound fresh out of hell".

The character's mannerisms carry a quality of unpredictability. His voice frequently shifts in pitch, so that he speaks his dialogue hitting higher notes, followed by an immediate lower voice capable of landing two octaves below. Nolan acknowledges this unpredictability to be part of the character's slinky physical movements as well, saying that Ledger's performance "[is] always a surprise". About the Joker's physical appearance, Geoff Boucher wrote for the Los Angeles Times that the character probes the facial scars with his tongue and "walks with shoulders bowed and his chin out and down, like a hyena".

Development 
Steve Alexander, Heath Ledger's agent, said the actor had a "pay-or-play" deal on The Dark Knight, "so he felt free to do whatever he wanted to do as the Joker, no matter how crazy." According to The Imaginarium of Doctor Parnassus cinematographer Nicola Pecorini, Ledger had talked with him about Johnny Depp's off-kilter portrayal of Jack Sparrow in Pirates of the Caribbean: The Curse of the Black Pearl in relation to The Dark Knight, aiming to make a performance that would be "so far out he'd be fired". As Ledger was cast early in pre-production, Nolan explained that the actor had "months and months" to prepare for the role.

During a span of six weeks, Ledger "locked" himself away in a hotel room, forming a character diary and experimenting with voices. "It's a combination of reading all the comic books I could that were relevant to the script and then just closing my eyes and meditating on it", he said about his process. The diary contains scrawling and cuttings inside. Christopher Hooton, writing for The Independent, said that the 'Joker journal' had several stills from Stanley Kubrick's film A Clockwork Orange, joker cards, photos of hyenas, unhinged clown makeup and the word "chaos" highlighted in green. Furthermore, it contains a list of things the Joker would find funny, such as AIDS, landmines, and geniuses suffering brain damage. It was revealed that Ledger had read Grant Morrison's The Clown at Midnight (Batman #663) and based the list upon the Batman writer's prose.

Ledger highlighted the importance of finding an iconic voice and laugh for the character, relating the voice as "the key to the demented killer". Nolan explained Ledger's early and "peculiar" ambition for the voice of the character, saying that the actor had studied the way ventriloquist dummies talk. The filmmaker also acknowledged that the voice performance was based on the Alexander technique.

Ledger developed the Joker's voice and mannerisms slowly over time and during camera tests. "Don't act, just read it", Nolan had told Ledger for a test screening. In hair and makeup tests, Ledger would start exploring the movements of the character. While test recording without sound, he shared his take on the Joker's voice and physicality, and "in that way he sort of sneaked upon it".

The actor developed the physical appearance of the character, being "very involved" with the painting of his face, says prosthetic supervisor Conor O'Sullivan. O'Sullivan acknowledged how Ledger, Nolan, and makeup artist John Caglione all gravitated towards a Francis Bacon painting Nolan was referring to. Ledger also got to choose the Joker's weapon among different rubber knives, and he worked closely with costume designer Lindy Hemming on deciding the look for the character.

Nolan noted, "We gave a Francis Bacon spin to [his face]. This corruption, this decay in the texture of the look itself. It's grubby. You can almost imagine what he smells like." Costume designer Lindy Hemming picked inspiration for the "chaotic" look from such countercultural pop culture artists as Iggy Pop, Johnny Rotten, and Sid Vicious. She gave the image for the Joker of someone who is "very sweaty" and who "probably doesn't have a proper home". She tried to present a backstory for the character "that he really doesn't look after himself".

Execution 

Application of Heath Ledger's makeup was done with the actor scrunching special facial expressions. Caglione called the application work "a dance". This technique created facial textures for white paint. As Ledger closed his eyes tight, Caglione put on the black makeup. Then, water was sprayed over the eyes and the actor would squeeze his eyes and shake his head to create imperfections in the makeup.

To get in character for filming, Ledger used his Joker diary which he carried with him on set. Between takes, Ledger would stay in costume and makeup just being himself. The actor would fool around, skateboarding while in his Joker costume on set, and smoking cigarettes. John Caglione described Ledger as helping others around to relax, never letting "the intense nature of the roles overwhelm him".

The first sequence shot was the film's IMAX opening, the "prologue". As the Joker wears a mask through the scene with minimal dialogue, Nolan set the prologue first in the schedule because he wanted to put off performance worries, allowing Ledger to enjoy that relief.

The interrogation scene between Batman and the Joker was the first scene shot with Ledger really showing the full performance altogether. The director and his leading actors all liked the idea of shooting the key scene early on. During rehearsals, the actors kept things loose and improvisational, saving for the actual shoot. Bale confirmed that Ledger did not perform the Joker's voice during rehearsals, waiting to get in character when the cameras rolled. Nolan later acknowledged the scene to be his favorite in the film, saying "I had never seen anybody sell a punch the way Heath was able to do with Christian."

Ledger was allowed to shoot and direct the threat videos the Joker sends out as warnings. Each take Ledger made was different from the last. Nolan was impressed enough with the first video shoot that he chose to not be present when Ledger shot the video with a kidnapped reporter (Anthony Michael Hall).

Heath Ledger always showed up early onset. The first thing he would do, according to Caglione, was to give bear hugs to cast and crew members around the set. "And no matter how banged-up or bruised Heath was after a long day, after we'd take off the last drop of makeup, he'd just hug everybody in the trailer before he left". At the end of shooting, on his Joker diary's final page, Ledger wrote "BYE BYE".

Effects of Heath Ledger's death 
On 22 January 2008, after he had completed filming The Dark Knight, Ledger died, aged 28, of an accidental prescription drug overdose, leading to intense press attention and memorial tributes. "It was tremendously emotional, right when he passed, having to go back in and look at him every day [during editing]", Nolan recalled. "But the truth is, I feel very lucky to have something productive to do, to have a performance that he was very, very proud of, and that he had entrusted to me to finish". All of Ledger's scenes appear as he completed them in the filming; in editing the film, Nolan added no digital effects to alter Ledger's actual performance posthumously. Nolan has dedicated the film in part to Ledger's memory.

Ledger's death affected the marketing campaign for The Dark Knight and also both the production and marketing of Terry Gilliam's film The Imaginarium of Doctor Parnassus; both Nolan and Gilliam celebrated and paid tribute to Ledger's work in these films. During production of The Dark Knight, Jai White's Gambol was meant to survive his confrontation with Ledger's Joker, which would have resulted in the Joker giving Gambol a Glasgow smile of his own and enabling the filmmakers to reuse Gambol in the future, with Jai White commenting that Gambol was supposed to have a bigger role in further sequels, returning to Gotham City and trying to take it over. Following Ledger's passing, despite the film's script not calling for Gambol's death, Nolan cut out several of Gambol's planned scenes and the editors had Gambol killed off by the Joker during their confrontation, something Jai White didn't find out until seeing the film during its premiere.

Writer David S. Goyer's original intent for the Batman Begins sequels in 2005 involved the Joker being apprehended by Batman with the aid of Commissioner Gordon and Harvey Dent in the second film and the Joker scarring Dent during his trial in the third film. However, most aspects of Goyer's film treatments were absorbed into The Dark Knight. According to Ledger's sister Kate, Ledger was planning to reprise his role as the Joker for another film, a notion supported by Aaron Eckhart, who recalled that Ledger had planned to return in a sequel. Nolan ultimately decided that the Joker would not return in The Dark Knight Rises and dispelled rumors that he would use unused footage from The Dark Knight to bring Ledger back.

Reception

Announcement and early response 
On 31 July 2006, The Dark Knight was officially announced by Warner Bros with the casting of Heath Ledger as the Joker. The casting decision surprised some and was seen as a controversial move at the time, receiving notable negative reactions on the Internet. Nolan remembered the cynicism he endured surrounding Ledger's casting, saying that "the whole world turned around and said 'What are you doing?' You know, Heath Ledger, Joker, didn't make any sense to people at all." In his 2016 book The Caped Crusade: Batman and the Rise of Nerd Culture, NPR contributor Glen Weldon recalled that fans were outraged over the choice of Ledger, due to his past roles in films such as Brokeback Mountain (2005).

However, with the first trailer released in 2007, the film and its portrayal of the Joker received very positive response from audiences and entertainment industry professionals alike. Mexican filmmaker Guillermo del Toro gushed of his impression for Ledger's performance, finding it "really, really edgy and scary". American Batman writers Paul Dini and Jeph Loeb both chimed with the positive reactions. Loeb, who had been critical of Jack Nicholson's portrayal of the Joker in 1989's Batman, expressed his excitement for Ledger's interpretation, saying the casting felt "just about right. I eagerly anticipate more!"

Critical reception 

Heath Ledger's portrayal of the Joker received universal critical acclaim, winning numerous posthumous awards for his performance, including the Academy Award for Best Supporting Actor, a Golden Globe Award for Best Supporting Actor in a Motion Picture, the BAFTA Award for Best Actor in a Supporting Role, the Saturn Award for Best Supporting Actor, a Screen Actors Guild Award for Outstanding Performance by a Male Actor in a Supporting Role, and a Best Actor International Award at the 2008 Australian Film Institute Awards.

"I can only speak superlatives of Ledger, who is mad-crazy-brilliant as the Joker", wrote Peter Travers of Rolling Stone, stating that the film is deeper than its predecessor, with a "deft" script that refuses to scrutinize the Joker with popular psychology. Travers praised the cast, saying each brings his or her A' game" to the film. Travers said Ledger moves the Joker away from Jack Nicholson's interpretation into darker territory, and expressed his support for any potential campaign to have Ledger nominated for an Academy Award. Roger Ebert of the Chicago Sun-Times stated that Heath Ledger's portrayal is a "key performance" and pondered whether he would become the first posthumous Academy Award-winning actor since Peter Finch in 1976.

Mark Dinning from Empire magazine called Ledger's performance "monumental" and wrote "The Dark Knight is Ledger's movie. It is a towering performance. ... A force of nature". Kevin Smith commented on Ledger, calling his "incredible" performance among "the most frightening, smart and well-played villains ever. Ever." Mark Lee, writing for The Daily Telegraph, commented that Ledger accomplished "a genuinely unsettling, brilliant nuanced portrait of evil". Tim Teeman commented for The Times that "Ledger is so terrifying and unpredictable that his very presence on screen makes you nervous." Total Film reviewed that Ledger is "burning brightly as he embodies an icon. ... This is the definitive Joker", calling the performance "a masterpiece". For The Hollywood Reporter, Kirk Honeycutt called Ledger's performance "a beauty". Entertainment Weekly put the film on its end-of-the-decade, "best-of" list, saying, "Every great hero needs a great villain. And in 2008, Christian Bale's Batman found his in Heath Ledger's demented dervish, the Joker." Emanuel Levy wrote Ledger "throws himself completely" into the role. David Denby of The New Yorker, otherwise critical of the film, praised Ledger's "sinister and frightening" performance, which he says is the film's one element of success. Denby called Ledger "mesmerising" and said, "His performance is a heroic, unsettling final act: this young actor looked into the abyss." "It's just one of the most iconic movie performances of modern times", declared chief film critic of Variety Scott Foundas. In 2009, Total Film issued its "The 150 Greatest Performances of All Time" list, ranking Ledgers' performance in The Dark Knight at 105th place.

Film critics, co-stars Maggie Gyllenhaal and Michael Caine, and many of Ledger's colleagues in the film community joined Bale in calling for and predicting a nomination for the 2008 Academy Award for Best Supporting Actor in recognition of Ledger's performance in The Dark Knight, which he would go on to receive and win. In 2022, Clayton Davis of Variety ranked Ledger's portrayal as the Joker the best superhero movie performance in the past 50 years.

Influence on other villains 
Bérénice Marlohe cited Ledger's performance as the Joker as an inspiration for her portrayal of Sévérine in the James Bond film Skyfall, specifically in regards to Sévérine's psychological instability, which Marlohe added to her performance in a subtle way, as the script didn't make the Bond girl's "craziness" obvious. On playing N'Jadaka / Erik "Killmonger" Stevens in the Marvel Cinematic Universe film Black Panther, Michael B. Jordan expressed his admiration for both Ledger's Joker performance, feeling that Ledger's portrayal, as well as Michael Fassbender's Magneto, motivated an actor to deliver an awesome performance as a comic book movie villain. Discussing his forthcoming portrayal as Kang the Conqueror in the MCU film Ant-Man and the Wasp: Quantumania in anticipation of his further appearances as the character in Avengers: The Kang Dynasty and Avengers: Secret Wars, fellow Marvel actor Jonathan Majors named Ledger's Joker as one of his inspirations to play Kang, having admired his Joker version for how far Ledger was willing to physically go during filming of The Dark Knight and for his character's complexity of good and evil, the latter deeply connecting with Majors due to growing up with a few criminals who displayed moral duality from time to time.

See also 
Joker in other media
Joker (Jack Napier)
Joker (DC Extended Universe)
Barack Obama "Joker" poster

References 

Action film villains
Batman characters
Characters created by Christopher Nolan
The Dark Knight Trilogy characters
DC Comics male supervillains
Fictional anarchists
Fictional characters with disfigurements
Fictional clowns
Fictional kidnappers
Fictional mass murderers
Fictional gangsters
Fictional nihilists
Fictional rampage and spree killers
Fictional serial killers
Fictional terrorists
Film characters introduced in 2008
Film supervillains
Film and television memes
Internet memes introduced in 2008
Joker (character)
Joker (character) in other media
Male film villains
Heath Ledger
Fictional bank robbers
Fictional characters without a name